Tomorrowland is a large-scale annual electronic dance music festival held at De Schorre provincial recreational park in Boom, Belgium.

Tomorrowland was first held in 2005, on an idea of ​​two brothers, Manu and Michiel Beers. Since then, it has become one of the most famous music festivals in the world. It has won numerous accolades and awards, including being voted five times in a row as "best musical event of the year" at the International Dance Music Awards. It employs 80 people year-round for the organisation and 12,000 people during the event.

History

2005

The first edition of the festival took place on 15 August 2005. Manu Beers, Michiel Beers and ID&T organized the festival. Performers included Push (M.I.K.E.), Armin van Buuren, Cor Fijneman, Yves Deruyter, Technoboy, Yoji Biomehanika and Coone.

2006

The second festival, on 30 July 2006, hosted Armin van Buuren, Axwell, Marco Bailey, Fred Baker, David Guetta, Ruthless and DJ Zany. The DJ and producer Paul Oakenfold was also announced on the poster, but canceled at the last moment, as he was on tour with Madonna at the time. Emjay, the producer of 'Stimulate', the anthem of 2006, performed on the main stage with The Atari Babies.

2007

The third year, the festival lasted two days for the first time in its history, taking place on 28 and 29 July 2007.

2008

In 2008, the festival took place on 26 and 27 July. For the first time, more than 100 DJs participated. The number of visitors exceeded 50,000 for the first time.

2009

For the fifth event, ID&T led to even more venues, one ski, and much more. Sun has included an "I Love the 90's" stage, where musicians such as Push, Natural Born Deejays and SASH from the dance scene were present. La Rocca performed live at the event for the first time. The special act on the main stage was Moby. Tomorrowland 2009 took place on 25 and 26 July and attracted 90,000 people. The festival saw the use of a theme for the first time - Masker (Mask).

2010
Tomorrowland sold out days before the event, with a record attendance of 120,000 visitors over two days, in 2010 Dada Life, Dimitri Vegas & Like Mike and Tara McDonald wrote the official anthem "Tomorrow/Give Into The Night", performing the song twice on the main stage after Swedish House Mafia. The track was made by Like Mike, Dada Life and Dimitri Vegas and the vocal melody and lyrics were written and recorded by Tara McDonald. The song reached number 5 in the Belgian commercial charts and is the biggest selling anthem for Tomorrowlands to date. The festival's theme was "Zon (Sun)" and was nominated for the Best Music Event by the International Dance Music Awards in 2011.

2011
2011 marked the festival's expansion to three days occurring on 22–24 July. Tomorrowland 2011 had the theme "The Tree of Life" and the anthem "The Way We See The World" by Dimitri Vegas & Like Mike featuring Afrojack and Nervo. Only a few days after the official pre-sale of tickets kicked off, Tomorrowland was completely sold out and had over 180,000 visitors. Among the artists performed in the event were David Guetta, Nervo, Swedish House Mafia, Avicii, Tiësto, Hardwell, Carl Cox, Paul van Dyk, Raven Tensnake, Laidback Luke, Brodinski, Juanma Tudon, Basto, Mike Matthews, De Jeugd van Tegenwoordig. It was voted the Best Music Event by the International Dance Music Awards for the first time in 2012.

2012

Tomorrowland 2012 took place on 27–29 July 2012 at the De Schorre, a provincial recreation area in Boom, Belgium, 16 kilometers south of Antwerp and 32 kilometers north of Brussels. The line-up consisted of 400 DJs, such as Ferry Corsten, Skrillex, Avicii, Marco Bailey, Skazi, David Guetta, Nervo, Hardwell, Swedish House Mafia, Afrojack, Steve Aoki, Juanma Tudon, Carl Cox, The Bloody Beetroots, Paul van Dyk, Martin Solveig, Chuckie, Fatboy Slim, Dimitri Vegas & Like Mike and Pendulum playing on fifteen stages each day. 185,000 people from over 75 countries around the world were in attendance, with 35,000 of them staying in Dreamville.

Because of the enormous success of Tomorrowland and the fact that it is a Belgian festival, ID&T decided to give Belgians an exclusive chance with a pre-sale (80,000 of the 180,000 tickets) on March 24. In less than one day, all of the tickets sold out and at some moments there were 2,000,000 people on the online waiting list. The worldwide sale started April 7. Within 43 minutes, the other 100,000 tickets sold out. In addition to regular tickets, Tomorrowland partnered with Brussels Airlines to provide exclusive travel packages from over 15 cities around the world. Other highlights of the festival were the Cloud Rider, the highest mobile Ferris wheel in Europe, and the fact that 25 flights were organized to bring spectators to the festival from all over the world.

The festival's theme was "The Book of Wisdom" and featured the anthem "Tomorrow Changed Today" by Dimitri Vegas & Like Mike. The festival again won the International Dance Music Awards in 2013 for the Best Music Event. Tomorrowland 2012 also won the DJ Award for the Best International Dance Music Festival.

2013

Tomorrowland 2013 took place on 26–28 July and reached 180,000 attendees at De Schorre in Boom, Belgium. Full madness passes sold out in 35 minutes, and the remainder of tickets sold out in a reported one second. Tomorrowland again offered its Global Journey packages with Brussels Airlines which had 140 additional flights from 67 different cities around the world transporting festival goers with 92 different nationalities to Boom, Belgium. The anthem for Tomorrowland 2013 was "Chattahoochee" by Dimitri Vegas & Like Mike featuring Maarten Vorwerk. This year's edition with the theme "The Arising of Life" saw performances from Axwell, Armin van Buuren, Hardwell, Afrojack, David Guetta, and Sebastian Ingrosso.

2014

To celebrate the tenth anniversary of the festival, and to meet the high demand for tickets, the 2014 edition of Tomorrowland was held over two weekends; 18–20 July and 25–27 July. The line-up for both weekends was more or less the same. In April 2014, MTV announced that it would produce two hour-long MTV World Stage specials featuring performances from the festival (to be aired in August 2014), and that it would produce a documentary surrounding the 10th anniversary of Tomorrowland.

On April 16, composer Hans Zimmer and Tomorrowland announced that they had produced a classical hymn that would premiere during the 10th anniversary edition of Tomorrowland. Veteran DJ Dave Clark, who hosted the second largest stage, believes that “a more diverse lineup that covered a wider range of underground music” was Tomorrowland 2014's top selling point. Dimitri Vegas & Like Mike again were responsible for the Tomorrowland anthem, this year working with W & W for the song "Waves". 360,000 people attended Tomorrowland 2014 which won the International Dance Music Award for Best Global Festival during the ceremony in March 2015.

2015

Tomorrowland 2015 took place on 24–26 July and saw 180,000 visitors. The theme for the year was "The Secret Kingdom of Melodia". Performers included Avicii, Hardwell, David Guetta, Tiësto, Armin van Buuren, and Carl Cox. The 2016 edition of the International Dance Music Awards awarded the Tomorrowland 2015 the Best Global Festival for the fifth consecutive year, and the readers of DJ Magazine voted Tomorrowland 2015 the World's Best Festival.

2016

Tomorrowland 2016 took place on 22–24 July. The theme for the year was "The Elixir of Life" and saw 180,000 visitors. The 2016 edition of Tomorrowland saw a surprise set from Tiësto on the Thursday prior to the weekend and was sponsored by Budweiser. Other performers included Axwell Λ Ingrosso, Martin Garrix, The Chainsmokers, and Dimitri Vegas & Like Mike.

2017
2017 saw Tomorrowland expand to a two weekend event for the first time since their tenth anniversary in 2014.
The theme, "Amicorum Spectaculum", and dates were announced in January 2017, and was scheduled for 21–23 and 28–30 July. This year, a record number of tickets was sold – 400,000 tickets spanning the two weekends. The festival saw a massive increase in the number of performers to span the 16 stages, including festival regulars and new artists making their festival debut.

Regular headliner Martin Garrix premiered his song "Pizza" as the closing song of his set. The song was originally intended to be a Tomorrowland exclusive before it was released as a single a month later. In 2017, the festival was nominated by the European Festivals Awards and the Electronic Music Awards for World's Best Festival. The festival was also visited by King Philippe and Queen Mathilde.

Towards the end of August, Tomorrowland 2017 became the biggest social media music events in the world at the time, reaching over 1.2 billion views from over 200 million people. Regular headliners Armin van Buuren and David Guetta stated the following with regards to the festival's achievements:

2018

The 2018 edition of Tomorrowland saw an attendance of 400,000 people for the second year running across the two weekends. The festival took place on 20–22 July and 27–29 July, with tickets for the two weekends selling out in an hour. Mainstage performers included Armin van Buuren, Black Coffee, David Guetta, Dimitri Vegas & Like Mike, Alan Walker and Martin Garrix. This edition also marked the return of Hardwell, who headlined the festival three years after his previous set in 2015. The theme for the 2018 edition of the festival was "The Story of Planaxis". Tomorrowland 2018 also saw numerous Avicii tributes to commemorate the death of the Swedish DJ, which occurred three months prior to the festival. Avicii's songs "Levels" and "Wake Me Up" came second and eighth respectively in Tomorrowland 2018's most played songs. Tributes to Avicii came from Axwell Λ Ingrosso, Don Diablo, Nicky Romero, and Dimitri Vegas & Like Mike. Digital Spy described the event as "the most elaborate festival on earth", with the only downside being the admission pricings.

2019

For its fifteenth anniversary, Tomorrowland returned to "The Book of Wisdom" as its mainstage theme, previously used in 2012. The festival took place on 19–21 and 26–28 July, and saw regular performers such as The Chainsmokers, Armin van Buuren, KSHMR and David Guetta return. Non-EDM artists like Bebe Rexha and ASAP Rocky were also on the lineup, however, the latter had to cancel his appearance following his arrest in Sweden. The mainstage design featured a tribute to Avicii, to whom tributes were also paid the previous year.

Supergroup Swedish House Mafia were rumoured to close the event following Steve Angello's claim in the autumn of the previous year that the group would play at the festival "by any means necessary". Rumours became even stronger when the group's signature "three dots" appeared on the Tomorrowland lineup. However, the "three dots" were announced last minute to be 3 Are Legend, leading many to believe that the group pulled out last minute. Axwell and Steve Angello claimed that the group were never booked for the festival.

2020
The year after the anniversary, Tomorrowland chose "The Reflection of Love" as its theme, which had been surreptitiously revealed on the main stage in 2019, as there was a book with that theme title near the right center of the stage with "2020" in Roman numerals. On 15 April, Tomorrowland announced that the 2020 edition of the festival would not take place due to the COVID-19 pandemic. On 4 June, Tomorrowland announced a virtual festival would go ahead in place of the 2020 edition. The virtual event, titled Tomorrowland Around the World, took place on 25 and 26 July, and utilized Unreal Engine 4 for the creation of the virtual environments used during the event.

Tomorrowland also organised a virtual New Year's Eve festival on 31 December, taking place from 8pm to 3am in each time zone.

2021
On 17 March 2021, Tomorrowland announced it would delay the return of the festival until the final weekend of August and the first weekend of September. The move was an attempt to make the festival more secure in light of declining COVID-19 infection rates and the vaccination programme. The move would have seen the festival occur five weeks later than its usual dates at the end of July. In April, Tomorrowland announced that a second edition of Tomorrowland Around the World would take place during the traditional July dates.

Despite Belgium planning to allow large-scale outdoor events with up to 75,000 people starting from 13 August 2021, on 17 June, the mayors of Boom and Rumst jointly announced that they would deny permission for Tomorrowland to be held, citing international travel concerns and the Delta variant. On 23 June, the festival was therefore cancelled for a second time.

2022

In December 2021, Tomorrowland announced that the festival would expand once from two to three weekends in 2022, taking place on 15–17 July, 22–24 July, and 29–31 July. The theme was "The Reflection of Love". The festival welcomed 600,000 visitors from 200 countries.

2023
The festival will take place during two weekends, 21 - 23 and 28- 30 July. About 600 DJ's will perform on 14 different stages. 

The line-up has been announced on January 28, 2023 during the special digital event "Adscendo - A Digital Introduction", an exclusive livestream for all pre-registered people. The event featured 30-60 minutes performances from R3HAB, Afrojack, Armin van Buuren, W&W, Amelie Lens, Ape Rave Club, Like Mike, Dom Dolla, Kölsch, Sunnery James & Ryan Marciano, Amber Broos, James Hype, Tale Of Us and Mandy. After the livestream, the performances were also uploaded to the Tomorrowland YouTube Channel.

Event summary

Venue

Tomorrowland is held at De Schorre public recreational park in Boom, Belgium. The park is administrated by the province of Antwerp. When not in use as the Tomorrowland venue, the park serves its normal purpose of providing green recreational spaces to the local population.

Stages

Mainstage
The mainstage is the centrepiece of the festival and has grown and evolved from its debut with the festival itself in 2005. Since then it has become largest and most elaborate stage of any festival across the globe. The mainstage features all the headline artists to tend to be more mainstream, and continues with sets until 1am. The mainstage design changes each year; which, since 2009, has been designed based on the festival theme for the year. For images of some of these designs, see the "History" section. In 2022 they built the largest mainstage, 270 meters wide end 53 meters high.

Atmosphere
Atmosphere was introduced to Tomorrowland in 2018, and is located inside a circus top tent. The stage is 32 metres tall and 20 metres wide, and is suspended from a custom-built crane. It is known for its LED lights and laser displays, which are produced from 18 arrays of 4 Kara each making up a 270° screen. The stage contains an L-ISA Immersive Hyperreal Sound system.

Cage
Cage is located behind Rave Cave and is home to harder styles of electronic dance music. The stage has darker lighting than the other indoor stages.

Casa Corona
Casa Corona was introduced in 2019 in place of the House of Masks. It is a small stage that functions more as bar than a stage despite music being played. The stage in located on the water's edge near to the Freedom stage.

Core

Core is located away from the main festival area and in part of the surrounding forest. The stage incorporates the local woodland into its design and makes use of wooden paneling and soft lighting to give the stage a more natural atmosphere.

Freedom

Freedom is often described as Tomorrowland's second stage. The stage is a two floor open warehouse design where performances can be viewed from the ground floor or numerous first floor balconies. Again this stage makes heavy use of LED lighting. In 2019, the roof was removed following a partial roof collapse due to the 2019 European heat wave.

In 2022, Freedom received a redesign. An extra floor was added, bringing the total to 3 floors (ground, first and second). Furthermore, the LED panels covering large parts of the roof were replaced with butterflies containing LED panels.

Garden of Madness
Officially known as "Dimitri Vegas & Like Mike presents Garden of Madness", the stage is built over the water and is a circular shape. The stage is in the centre of the circle. It features hanging plants growing from the ceiling and water fountains surround the stage. Since 2017 Dimitri Vegas & Like Mike have brought the Garden of Madness to Ushuaïa for an annual summer residency. In 2018, they also collaborated with Creamfields for a special one-off event.

Harbour House
Harbour House is a small stage located above the water between Q-Dance and Casa Corona. The stage is house shaped and makes use of bubble and smoke machines.

Kara Savi
Kara Savi was introduced in 2019 and replaced The Tulip. The stage is a medium sized stage with a sea shell shaped design. It has a sand dancefloor and generally sees a large gathering of dancers, with dancers dancing around the surrounding banks.

Leaf
Leaf is a fairly small house music stage located on the walkway across the lake that divides the Tomorrowland site. The stage has a geodome design.

Lotus
Lotus is a grass amphitheatre with a concrete dancefloor and grass terraces. The stage is generally sparsely populated with dancers. The stage has a very relaxed atmosphere with dancers mostly choosing to sit or lie down and simply listen to the music. The stage sees a mix of established artists and newcomers to the industry.

L'Orangerie
L'Orangerie is another stage built over water and is a semi-circular shape. The stage has a metal dance floor and is built out of stained glass and exposed metal beams. It saw its debut at Tomorrowland Winter 2019.

Q-Dance
Q-Dance was debuted as its own stage in 2019 replacing Theatre Formidable (French for "Great Theatre"), and is home to harder styles of electronic dance music. The stage designed features a giant sword piercing the earth which can be seen from most places across the site. This stage also makes heavy used of LED lighting.

Rave Cave
Rave Cave is the smallest Tomorrowland stage. It is converted from a tunnel under a bridge which has one entrance blocked off. The stage is very intimate and can only host a small number of dancers.

Rose Garden

 
Rose Garden is one of the oldest stages at Tomorrowland. The stage is semi-circular and had a lattice framing. The stage's most iconic feature is a giant mechanical dragon which is moving constantly, including mouth opening and blinking. Steam jets are located inside the mouth and nose to give the impression that it is breathing smoke.

The Moose Bar
Located at the end, far left of the main entrance. The Moose Bar was introduced for the first time in 2019. It is a recplica of a ski-lodge. Apres Ski ambience with Belgian deejays,female dancers dressed up in oktoberfest tenue and a lot of beer.

Youphoria

Youphoria (pronounced "Euphoria") is a fairly large stage which is half covered at the rear of the dancefloor. The stage has a fairly plain design apart from the giants mushrooms which appeared to grow from the DJ booth.
 
Source: 2019 Stages:

Flag

The festival's flag features the Tomorrowland logo on a background split into four quadrants diagonally, each separated by a white diagonal stripe, which in turn is bordered by a black diagonal stripe on each side, expanding towards the corners.

The festival logo features a butterfly, crown and an eye. The butterfly symbolises freedom, the beauty of nature, and the purity of the human soul. The crown symbolises equality and stewardship, where as the eye encourages people to look out for each other and appreciate nature's beauty. The four background colours represent the classical elements of nature – water, earth, fire, and air.

For every flag bought, Tomorrowland donates €5 to the Tomorrowland Foundation, a global charity aiming to teach music, dance, and arts to children across the globe.

Catering and accommodation

Tomorrowland's Dreamville currently has seven camping areas ahead of the 2021 event. The camping options range from the Magnificent Greens Area which houses basic campers to the Terra Soils Area which is their most luxurious camping option featuring lockable suites. Tomorrowland also offers mansion packages where guests stay in a privately rented mansion in the local countryside, and hotel packages where guests can stay in a variety of Brussels hotels.

In terms of catering, the Tomorrowland site has numerous food outlets across the site serving a variety of street foods from across the globe; as well as local Belgian specialities.

Promotion and economy

Sponsorships and social media

Tomorrowland currently has twenty six official partners including Pepsi Max, Budweiser, and Brussels Airlines which do various work to promote the festival. Since 2011, Tomorrowland has been filming the event and posting the sets on YouTube. The filming is also used to make an official aftermovie in which extra emphasis is put on the festival goers aiming to expand ticket sales for the following year. The film crew is made up of about 200 editors, producers, and camera people. Tomorrowland's YouTube channel has over 1,828,744,611 views as of July 2022, and over 10.2 million subscribers as of July 2022. Elsewhere on social media, Tomorrowland has over 7.8 million followers on Instagram, and over 2.4 million followers on Twitter.

The 2012 edition of Tomorrowland saw the debut of the Tomorrowland's Global Journey packages in partnership with Brussels Airlines. The package includes a weekend ticket in addition to flights and hotels and saw 25 flights carrying 2,000 passengers from 17 departure cities. 2013 saw a large increase in popularity for this package seeing 140 flights carrying 8,000 passengers from 67 cities with the top five flight destination being Basel, Tel Aviv, Geneva, Oslo, and London. Buyers of the Global Journey packages had the option to upgrade to party flights of which there were twenty; ten standard, eight with streamed music and two with live DJ sets. Previous Global Journey setlists have come from Dimitri Vegas & Like Mike, Yves V, and Romeo Blanco. Since 2017, Tomorrowland has been partnered with Dance FM UAE allowing live setlists from the festival and exclusive interviews with the performers to be broadcast on the station.

YouTube Creator Awards    (10.4 million subscribers - October 2022)

Employment and economic impact

Tomorrowland 2013 brought €70 million to the Belgian economy, €19 million of which was spent by people living outside of Belgium. In 2016 the festival brought €100 million and employed 700 people full-time before and during the festival. 2017 reported a similar value, again bringing €100 million to the local economy but this year employing a reported 12,000 people during the festival. A crew of 12,000 was also employed for the 2018 edition. The 2019 edition saw an expanded crew, with 15,000 staff members employed, and was estimated to have made €20 million in profit.

Spin-off festivals

TomorrowWorld

On March 20, 2013, ID&T Belgium and SFX Entertainment announced that it would begin organizing an American spin-off of Tomorrowland, known as TomorrowWorld. The festival is held at the Bouckaert Farm in Chattahoochee Hills, Georgia, located 48 kilometers (30 miles) southwest of Atlanta. The site was specifically chosen due to its resemblance to the Boom location in which Tomorrowland is traditionally held.

The inaugural edition of TomorrowWorld, held 27, 28, and 29 September 2013, reused the "Book of Wisdom" design used for the main stage at Tomorrowland in 2012. The festival played host to over 140,000 attendees over the weekend. TomorrowWorld brought more than music, dancing and stunning visuals to the area that year - it brought an economic boost. Officials reported TomorrowWorld 2013 brought $85.1 million into the Georgia economy, including $70 million directly to Atlanta. That $70 million matches the impact the city got from hosting the NCAA Final Four in 2013.

Nearly 140,000 attended the event, and their direct expenditures added $28.7 million into the local economy in areas such as lodging, restaurants and sight-seeing, TomorrowWorld officials said.

The 2014 edition of TomorrowWorld was held on 26, 27, and 28 September 2014. The theme was "The Arising of Life," and used the volcano main stage which debuted at Tomorrowland in 2013. The festival hosted a pre-festival concert called "The Gathering" on Thursday 25 September 2014 for attendees staying in Dreamville, the camp grounds of TomorrowWorld. Over 40,000 people camped at Dreamville, selling out the basic camping option. More than 160,000 people attended TomorrowWorld 2014.

The third and final edition of TomorrowWorld was held on the weekend of September 25, 26, and 27 2015. The event descended into chaos after being marred by inclement weather. Rain showers resulted in muddy terrain at the festival grounds, and entrance roadways to the grounds becoming unusable. On Saturday, due to the road conditions, organizers restricted shuttle service for attendees traveling back to Atlanta; those who were not stranded without shelter at the grounds overnight were required to hike miles towards areas where taxi cab and Uber drivers offered rides back to Atlanta at high prices. The following morning, festival organizers announced that the remainder of the festival would only be open to those who had camped on-site, and that refunds would be issued to those who were affected by the transport issues or had bought tickets for day 3.

On March 2, 2016, the official TomorrowWorld Facebook page announced that the festival will not be held in 2016.

Tomorrowland Brasil

As announced on July 20, 2014, by David Guetta's streamed Tomorrowland set to Brazil, and on the Tomorrowland website, the next edition to Tomorrowland Brasil was held on May 1–3, 2015 in Itu, São Paulo. Various DJ's performed such as W&W, Hardwell, Dimitri Vegas & Like Mike, Showtek, Steve Aoki, and many more main stage performers. Some of the stage hosts were Revealed Recordings, Dim Mak, Smash The House, Q-Dance, Super You & Me and many more.

The mainstage again reused the "Book of Wisdom" theme. All 180,000 tickets sold out one day after being announced.

The second edition of Tomorrowland Brasil took place once again at Itu in São Paulo, Brasil during April 21–23, 2016. The lineup included Axwell & Ingrosso, Ferry Corsten, Laidback Luke, Loco Dice, Markus Schulz, Afrojack, Alesso, Armin van Buuren, Chris Lake, Infected Mushroom, Nicky Romero, Dimitri Vegas & Like Mike, Solomun, Steve Angello, and many others.

In November 2016, it was announced that Tomorrowland Brasil would not return due to concerns over the country's economic instability. In December 2022, after a six-year hiatus, a new edition of the event was confirmed for October 12, 13 and 14, 2023.

Tomorrowland Winter

In March 2018, Tomorrowland announced the coming of a new festival, Tomorrowland Winter, to take place annually during the second or third week in March in Alpe d'Huez in the French Alps.

The first Tomorrowland Winter took place between 13 and 15 March 2019 and used the theme "The Hymn of the Frozen Lotus". It featured Martin Garrix, Dimitri Vegas & Like Mike, Armin van Buuren, Martin Solveig, Afrojack, DJ Snake, Steve Aoki and others. For the participants, the choice of 4 or 7 day passes were available for packages including accommodation and skiing.

On 13 August 2019, Tomorrowland announced that Tomorrowland Winter would return to the Alpe d'Huez for the 2020 edition which will be on the 3rd week of March with ticket sales opening in September. On 5 March 2020, the French Government decided to cancel the 2020 edition due to the COVID-19 pandemic. On 6 October 2020, it was announced that the 2021 edition would also be cancelled due to the pandemic.  Tomorrowland made its return to Alpe d'Huez for the second edition of Tomorrowland Winter from March 19-26, 2022. The aftermovie has 1,200,000 views on Youtube.

Unite with Tomorrowland
 
Tomorrowland has also organized Unite with Tomorrowland events in other countries, which serve as a satellite link to the main event in Belgium featuring live streams from the festival with synchronized effects, joined by in-person headliners. Unite with Tomorrowland currently operates in the United Arab Emirates, Germany, Spain, Lebanon, Taiwan, Malta, South Korea, Greece, and Israel.

Incidents

On the 29th of July 2017, the Unite event in Parc de Can Zam, Barcelona, Spain was cut short after the stage caught fire due to a "technical malfunction" causing over 22,000 people to be evacuated. Firefighters on the scene hypothesised that the fire was caused by a failed pyrotechnics display however this was never officially confirmed. Twenty five percent of the stage was destroyed and twenty people were treated for minor injuries or anxiety.

In a statement, Tomorrowland said:

In 2019, after Weekend 1, The Freedom Stage ceiling went down due to a storm, and it was kept closed for Weekend 2. The Freedom Stage was converted into an open air stage outside the doors of the stage.

Awards and nominations

DJ Awards

DJ Magazine

European Festivals Awards

Electronic Music Awards

Festicket Awards

International Dance Music Awards

Pre-2016

2018-Present

MTV Europe Music Awards

Red Bull Elektropedia Awards

UK Festival Awards

See also
List of electronic music festivals

Notes

References

External links

Music festivals established in 2005
2005 establishments in Belgium
Electronic music festivals in Belgium
Boom, Belgium
Summer events in Belgium